Jo Jong-ryol (born 1 February 1940) is a North Korean gymnast. He competed in eight events at the 1972 Summer Olympics.

References

1940 births
Living people
North Korean male artistic gymnasts
Olympic gymnasts of North Korea
Gymnasts at the 1972 Summer Olympics
Place of birth missing (living people)